German submarine U-382 was a Type VIIC U-boat of Nazi Germany's Kriegsmarine during World War II.

She carried out seven patrols before being badly damaged by British bombs in Wilhelmshaven on 12 January 1945.

She was a member of eight wolfpacks.

She damaged one ship.

Design
German Type VIIC submarines were preceded by the shorter Type VIIB submarines. U-382 had a displacement of  when at the surface and  while submerged. She had two shafts and two  propellers.

U-382 was fitted with five  torpedo tubes (four fitted at the bow and one at the stern), fourteen torpedoes, one  SK C/35 naval gun, 220 rounds, and a  C/30 anti-aircraft gun. The boat had a complement of between forty-four and sixty.

Service history
The submarine was laid down on 30 July 1941 at the Howaldtswerke yard at Kiel as yard number 13, launched on 21 March 1942 and commissioned on 25 April under the command of Kapitänleutnant Herbert Juli.

First patrol
The boat's first patrol commenced with her departure from Kiel on 10 September 1942. Passing through the gap between Iceland and the Faroe Islands, she was depth charged by an unknown aircraft in mid-Atlantic on 12 October. The damage sustained was serious enough to cut the patrol short. The submarine docked in St. Nazaire in occupied France on the 31st.

Second and third patrols
Another depth charge attack by the escorts of Convoy UC 1 south of the Azores forced the boat to withdraw to Lorient on 8 March 1943.

During her third foray, she was depth charged for 16 hours by the escorts of Convoy HX 233 west of the Bay of Biscay before arriving at St. Nazaire on 24 April 1943.

Fourth, fifth and sixth patrols
This sortie (number four), took the boat to Liberia and the Ivory Coast on the west African coast and at 81 days, it was her longest.

During her fifth patrol, U-382 was attacked and severely damaged northeast of the Azores on 11 January 1944. Two days later, she was also attacked by destroyers of the  hunter/killer group.

With the Allied landings at Normandy on 6 June 1944, the boat left St. Nazaire and docked further south at La Pallice on the 15th.

Seventh patrol
It was decided to move U-382 from France to Norway. She left La Pallice on 10 September 1944, negotiated the Iceland/Faroes 'gap' in the other direction and arrived in Bergen on 19 October.

Fate
Having sailed to Flensburg in November 1944, U-382 was badly damaged by the RAF in a raid on Wilhelmshaven on 12 January 1945. She was raised on 20 March but scuttled on 5 May.

Wolfpacks
U-382 took part in eight wolfpacks, namely:
 Luchs (27 September – 6 October 1942) 
 Panther (6 – 11 October 1942) 
 Leopard (12 – 13 October 1942) 
 Robbe (16 – 25 February 1943) 
 Without name (15 – 18 April 1943) 
 Borkum (18 December – 3 January 1944) 
 Borkum 1 (3 – 13 January 1944) 
 Rügen (13 – 15 January 1944)

Summary of raiding history

References

Bibliography

External links

German Type VIIC submarines
U-boats commissioned in 1942
U-boats sunk in 1945
U-boats sunk by British aircraft
1942 ships
Ships built in Kiel
World War II submarines of Germany
U-boat accidents
Maritime incidents in October 1944
Maritime incidents in January 1945
Maritime incidents in May 1945
Operation Regenbogen (U-boat)